Maren Nyland Aardahl (born 2 March 1994) is a Norwegian female handball player who plays for Odense Håndbold and the Norwegian national team.
 
Aardahl started her career as a back, but retrained as a pivot.

She also has medals from competing at beach handball championships for Norway.

Achievements 
World Championship:
Winner: 2021
European Championship
Winner: 2022
Norwegian League:
Silver Medalist: 2012/2013, 2013/2014

Individual awards
All-Star Best Defender of the Romanian League: 2021

References

1994 births
Living people
Sportspeople from Trondheim
Norwegian female handball players 
Expatriate handball players
Norwegian expatriate sportspeople in Denmark
Norwegian expatriate sportspeople in Germany
Norwegian expatriate sportspeople in Romania